Samira Koppikar is a music director, composer, singer and songwriter. In 2015 she made her debut as a Bollywood music composer with the song "Maati Ka Palang" for the film NH10. As a Bollywood playback singer she made a big bang entry into Bollywood playback singing in 2014 with two back to back songs Aaj Phir Tum Pe for the film Hate Story 2 which was number 7 in the top 10 Bollywood songs of 2014, and "Mohabbat Barsaa Dena tu" for the film Creature 3D. Co-sung with Arijit Singh, both the voice and the songs were an instant hit. Special non-film achievements: she performed at the Montreal Jazz Festival at a young age alongside the likes of Louiz Banks and Joe Alvarez.

Early life 
Samira was born into a Konkani Chitrapur Saraswat Family from Bandra, Mumbai and has studied interior design. She has trained in Hindustani classical music.

Career
Samira started recording for advertising jingles. While she was in the process of forming another band, her talent was spotted by Indian Jazz Gurus Louis Banks and Joe Alvarez at a jamming session. They became her mentors and source of inspiration ever since.
Besides performing with her mentors, Samira appeared with some of the best musicians at corporate shows and music festivals across India and abroad. The best among them are Montreal International Jazz Festival in 2010, Lavasa Music and Art Festival, and Taj Vivanta Mumbai and Pune. Arko Mukherjee heard Samira while she was performing one of her own compositions and offered her ‘Aaj Phir Tumpe Pyar Aaya hai", her first playback song as a singer for the Bollywood film Hate Story 2 from 2014, has been a huge hit with around 12 million hits on YouTube. This was followed by another hit number ‘Mohabbat Barsa De’ for the film Creature 3D.
Then Samira released her debut single ‘Bebasi’—a song and music video—as a singer songwriter in the Indie Space. Another composition and song ‘Maati Ka Palang’ by Samira has been featured as part of a film score and album for the 2015 Bollywood movie NH10. The film has been produced by Phantom Films, Eros International and Clean Slate Films and is directed by Navdeep Singh. The film features Anushka Sharma and Neil Bhoopalam in lead roles. Samira was greatly appreciated for her next Bollywood composition "Bairaagi" from Bareilly Ki Barfi which was also nominated for the Filmfare Awards & Mirchi Music Awards.

Apart from composing and singing for Bollywood films, Samira also maintains her strong presence in the independent space with songs released independently like Bebasi featuring musicians such as Kalyan Baruah, Gino Banks and Sheldon D'silva, Kaanch Ke (featuring Lipstick Under My Burkha fame Aahna Kumra), etc. to her credit.

Samira has composed soundtracks for films like Bareilly ki Barfi, NH10, Dobaara and her recent work is the full music of the Saif Ali Khan starrer Laal Kaptaan.

Filmography

As a Bollywood music director and composer

As playback singer

Indie music and collaborations

Awards and nominations

References 

Indian women singer-songwriters
Indian singer-songwriters
English-language singers from India
Musicians from Mumbai
Bollywood playback singers
Hindi-language singers
Indian women playback singers
Singers from Mumbai
Indian pop composers
Hindi film score composers
Indian women pop singers
21st-century Indian singers
Living people
Women musicians from Maharashtra
21st-century Indian women singers
Year of birth missing (living people)